Blake Stern (June 25, 1917 – December 22, 1987) was an American tenor, best known as an oratorio singer, and a professor emeritus of music at Yale University, where he taught voice.

He was born in Logan, Iowa. A graduate of Grinnell College in 1940, he was an intelligence officer in the US Navy during World War II. After the war, he enrolled at Juilliard School
in New York City before becoming an esteemed teacher at the Yale faculty for 32 years. One of his notable pupils was tenor John Stewart. During his career he performed at venues such as Carnegie Hall and toured the world.

References

American tenors
1917 births
1987 deaths
Yale University faculty
Grinnell College alumni
Juilliard School alumni
People from Logan, Iowa
20th-century American singers
20th-century American male singers
United States Navy personnel of World War II